Baddoki Gosaian is a village located in Tehsil Gujranwala  District Gujranwala, Punjab. The village has remnants of the Sikh Empire.

History
Baddoki Gosaian is one of the most historically significant villages of the Gujranwala District. It is often locally referred to as Badoki. It was a home to Sikhs, Hindus, and Muslims before the Partition of India. In 1947, several Sikh families migrated from Baddoki to India and similarly from India several Muslim families migrated to the village. Migrant families still use the homes and lands of those who emigrated from the village.

See also
 Badoki Saikhwan
 Qila Didar Singh

Villages in Gujranwala District